Scott Baio Is 45...and Single is an American reality television show that aired on VH1 starring Scott Baio. The second season, titled Scott Baio Is 46...and Pregnant, began on January 13, 2008.

Synopsis
Under the supervision of his personal life coach, Dr. Alison Arnold, Baio visits some of his old girlfriends over an eight-week period in an attempt to figure out why he cannot commit to only one woman. Dr. Arnold's plan includes Baio apologizing to the exes he hurt and advises him to not see his current girlfriend, Renee, during the eight-week period.

The series also features Baio's three closest friends, including Johnny Venocur (aka "Johnny V") and Jason Hervey (who also created, wrote, and produced the show with Bischoff-Hervey Entertainment's Eric Bischoff). The crew includes several writers, including Bischoff, who held key positions within the WCW (president; head writer; executive producer) and WWE (on-air talent; co-writer) professional wrestling companies.

Series finale
In the series finale, Baio comes to terms with his commitment issues and proposes to his long-time girlfriend Renee. After the proposal, Renee reveals she is pregnant.

In an interview with William Shatner (featured on Shatner's Raw Nerve), Baio admitted that he and Renee had actually gotten married in their backyard prior to taping it on the reality show.

Episodes

References

External links

2007 American television series debuts
2007 American television series endings
2000s American reality television series
English-language television shows
VH1 original programming